Levente Andrei Bartha (born 8 March 1977) is a Romanian former bobsledder and javelin thrower. He competed in the 2006 and 2018 Winter Olympics.

In the javelin, he won gold at the 2007 Military World Games, a bronze medal at the 2009 Francophonie Games and was a three-time champion at the Balkan Athletics Championships. At national level, he won at least twelve titles at the Romanian Athletics Championships.

References

1977 births
Living people
Romanian male bobsledders
Romanian male javelin throwers
Olympic bobsledders of Romania
Bobsledders at the 2006 Winter Olympics
Bobsledders at the 2018 Winter Olympics
Romanian people of Hungarian descent
Balkan Athletics Championships winners

Romanian sportspeople of Hungarian descent